The Asticcacaulis are a genus of bacteria.

Etymology
The name Asticcacaulis derives from:
  Greek prefix a, not; New Latin noun sticca, stick; Latin masculine gender noun caulis, stalk; Latin masculine gender noun Asticcacaulis, stalk that does not stick.

References

Caulobacterales
Bacteria genera